SATEB (Workers’ Esperanto Movement) is the British affiliate of the non-nationalist world organisation SAT (Sennacieca Asocio Tutmonda) which is a worldwide worker movement active in socialist, peace, trade union, feminist and environmental issues.

SATEB organizes an annual residential weekend at The Wedgwood Memorial College, Barlaston, Stoke-on-Trent. The main feature of these meetings is the visit of Esperanto-speaking lecturers from abroad (e.g. from Cuba, Germany, the Netherlands, Belgium, and other countries).

Members of SATEB receive the bilingual quarterly magazine La Verda Proleto.

Proposed suspension 

At the 2007 annual meeting of SATEB, which seven people attended including the guest speaker, the committee proposed a motion to suspend activity of SATEB until there emerged sufficient people to perform its essential roles.  However, after debate it was decided to continue at a minimal level of activity.
(Source: La Brita Esperantisto, spring 2007 edition)

External links
SATEB

Esperanto organizations